Cerro Kilambé Natural Reserve is a nature reserve in Nicaragua. It is one of the 78 reserves that are under official protection in the country.

External links
 Kilambé Massif Natural Reserve - Explore Nicaragua

Protected areas of Nicaragua
Jinotega Department
Central American montane forests